Note that in some older sources "Ciudad Trujillo's cathedral" refers to Catedral de Santa María la Menor, Santo Domingo, since the capital of the Dominican Republic was called "Ciudad Trujillo" from 1930 to 1961, after the dictator Rafael Trujillo, who renamed the capital after himself.
Trujillo Cathedral (constructed 1647–1666) is the cathedral of Trujillo, Peru.

History
The most notable maestro de capilla of Trujillo cathedral, from 1721 to 1728, was the composer Roque Ceruti, later maestro at Lima Cathedral.

Spanish painter Leonardo Jaramillo created the work Cristo de la columna (1643) which is located at this cathedral.

References

External links

Roman Catholic cathedrals in Peru
Buildings and structures in Trujillo, Peru
Tourist attractions in Trujillo, Peru
Basilica churches in Peru